Don Fernando Fernández de Córdova y Valcárcel, 2nd Marquess of Mendigorría (2 September 1809, in Buenos Aires – 30 October 1883, in Madrid), was a Spanish military, politician, and Prime minister of Spain for one day.

Biography
Born into a military family as the son of José de Córdoba y Rojas, he and his brother Luis fought in the First Carlist War on the side of Isabelinos.  He belonged to the Partido Moderado.
 
In 1847 he became Lieutenant General and as Captain General of Catalonia during the Second Carlist War, he put down the isolated rebel cells in that region by early 1849.

In May 1849 he was sent to Italy to help to protect Pope Pius IX against the Italian Revolution of 1848. He led a force of 4,000 Spanish soldiers, who were deployed in Gaeta and placed at the Pope's disposition. This marked the Spanish Army's first expeditionary venture into Italy since the War of the Austrian Succession a hundred years prior. Spanish columns secured the region and assisted the French in their operations at Itri.

He became War Minister and was even Prime Minister for one day (July 18, 1854) in full political crisis, which ended when Baldomero Espartero became head of the "progressive Biennium" of 1854–1856.

Fernando had always supported Queen Isabella II of Spain, but backed the Revolution of 1868 against the Crown, and joined the Radical Democratic Party.

In 1872 under King Amadeo I of Spain, he became acting Prime Minister between June 13 and June 16, before retiring completely from political life in 1873.

|-
 

1809 births
1883 deaths
People from Buenos Aires
Spanish generals
Prime Ministers of Spain
Government ministers of Spain
Radical Democratic Party (Spain) politicians
Moderate Party (Spain) politicians
19th-century Spanish politicians
Captains General of Catalonia
Government ministers during the First Spanish Republic